Senator Randolph may refer to:

Members of the United States Senate
 Jennings Randolph (1902–1998), U.S. Senator from West Virginia from 1958 to 1985
 John Randolph of Roanoke (1773–1833), U.S. Senator from Virginia from 1825 to 1827
 Theodore Fitz Randolph (1826–1883), U.S. Senator from New Jersey from 1875 to 1881

United States state senate members
 Benjamin F. Randolph (1820–1868), South Carolina State Senate
 Byron B. Randolph (fl. 1940s), West Virginia State Senate
 James Henry Randolph (1825–1900), Tennessee State Senate
 Lonnie Randolph (born 1949), Indiana State Senate
 Ned Randolph (1942–2016), Louisiana State Senate
 Samuel W. Randolph (1872–1941), Wisconsin State Senate
 Thomas Mann Randolph Jr. (1768–1828), Virginia State Senate